Aha! is a Philippine television informative show broadcast by GMA Network. Hosted by Drew Arellano, it premiered on April 4, 2010 on the network's Sunday morning line up.

The show is streaming online on YouTube.

Hosts
 Drew Arellano

Segment hosts
 Betong Sumaya
 Isko Salvador
 Boobay
 Rhian Ramos

Production
Principal photography was halted in March 2020 due to the enhanced community quarantine in Luzon caused by the COVID-19 pandemic. The show resumed its programming on October 11, 2020.

Ratings
According to AGB Nielsen Philippines' Mega Manila household television ratings, the pilot episode of Aha! earned a 10.1% rating.

Accolades

References

External links
 
 

2010 Philippine television series debuts
Filipino-language television shows
GMA Network original programming
GMA Integrated News and Public Affairs shows
Philippine television shows
Television productions suspended due to the COVID-19 pandemic